Cumberland Fossil Plant is a pulverized coal-fired power station located west of Cumberland City, Tennessee, USA, on the south bank of Lake Barkley on the Cumberland River. Owned and operated by Tennessee Valley Authority (TVA), it has a gross capacity of 2,470 MW, and is the most powerful power station in Tennessee.

Description
Commissioned in 1968, the Cumberland Fossil Plant contains two identical units, rated at 1.235 GWe gross each, Units 1 and 2 were launched into service in March and November 1973, respectively. In 2004, the two units accounted for almost 12% of TVA's total electricity generation. As of the mid 2010s, however, TVA's Sequoyah Nuclear Plant near Soddy Daisy, Tennessee, with a slightly lower capacity, was generating more power.

The Cumberland Fossil Plant has two of the tallest chimneys in the world at 1,001 feet (305 m), built in 1970. These chimneys are no longer in use, having been replaced with smaller chimneys connected to the scrubbers.

Bituminous coal is delivered by barges along the Cumberland River waterway. The plant consumes about 20,000 tons of coal a day. All of the waste heat is dumped into Cumberland River water.

Pollution and releases into environment

Environmental protection measures
To reduce sulfur dioxide (SO2) emissions, both units at Cumberland use wet limestone scrubbers. To reduce nitrogen oxides (NOx), the units use low-NOx burners as well as selective catalytic reduction systems, which were completed in 2004.

See also

List of power stations in Tennessee
List of the largest coal power stations in the United States

References

External links
TVA Page for Cumberland Fossil Plant
Chimney Diagram

Towers completed in 1970
Energy infrastructure completed in 1973
Towers in Tennessee
Coal-fired power stations in Tennessee
Buildings and structures in Stewart County, Tennessee
Chimneys in the United States
1973 establishments in Tennessee